Zied Ayet Ikram (born December 18, 1988 in Tunis) is an amateur Greco-Roman wrestler, who competed for Tunisia until 2015 and since then has competed for Morocco.  He competes in the men's middleweight category.

Ayet Ikram represented Tunisia at the 2012 Summer Olympics in London, where he competed in the men's 74 kg class. He received a bye for the preliminary round of sixteen match, before losing out to French wrestler and Olympic bronze medalist Christophe Guénot, who was able to score five points in two straight periods, leaving Ayet Ikram without a single point.

Ayet Ikram represented Morocco at the 2016 Summer Olympics in Rio de Janeiro. He again competed in the men's middleweight class.  He lost his last 16 match to Yang Bin.

References

External links
 
NBC Olympics Profile

1988 births
Living people
Tunisian male sport wrestlers
Olympic wrestlers of Tunisia
Wrestlers at the 2012 Summer Olympics
Wrestlers at the 2016 Summer Olympics
Sportspeople from Tunis
Olympic wrestlers of Morocco